Micaela Cocks (born 2 May 1986) is a professional basketball player from New Zealand. She currently plays for the Townsville Fire in the WNBL.

Professional career

College
Cocks played college basketball for the Oregon Ducks in 	Eugene, Oregon, participating in NCAA Division I. In her final season, she was awarded a place on the All-Pac-10 First-Team.

Oregon statistics

Source

Europe
Cocks first travelled to Poland after signing with Energa Torun. However, she would only play four games before transferring to France, to play for Cote d'Opale Basket Calais. Once again, she would only participate in four games until her season was cut short.

Australia
Micaela Cocks was signed for the 2011–12 season, with the Townsville Fire. She has since been a strong, consistent member of their roster. Playing an instrumental role in their title runs in 2015 and 2016, alongside the likes of Suzy Batkovic and Cayla George. In the 2016 WNBL Finals, against the Perth Lynx, Cocks was awarded the WNBL Grand Final Most Valuable Player Award for her showings through the series. Cocks has been re-signed for the 2016–17 and 2017–18 seasons.

National team
At the 2006 Commonwealth Games she won a silver medal as part of the Tall Ferns New Zealand women's basketball team. She represented New Zealand and the Tall Ferns again at the 2008 Summer Olympics. She has taken home a silver medal at the FIBA Oceania Championship on four occasions. She has also participated in two Olympic qualifying tournaments with the Tall Ferns, in 2012 and 2016. Unfortunately, both times, the Tall Ferns fell short on Olympic qualification.

References

1986 births
Living people
Basketball players at the 2006 Commonwealth Games
Basketball players at the 2008 Summer Olympics
Basketball players at the 2018 Commonwealth Games
Commonwealth Games bronze medallists for New Zealand
Commonwealth Games medallists in basketball
Commonwealth Games silver medallists for New Zealand
Guards (basketball)
New Zealand expatriate basketball people in Australia
New Zealand women's basketball players
Olympic basketball players of New Zealand
Oregon Ducks women's basketball players
Basketball players from Auckland
People from Takapuna
Tauihi Basketball Aotearoa players
Medallists at the 2018 Commonwealth Games